Andrzej Józef Gut-Mostowy (born 30 October 1960) is a Polish politician. He was elected to the Sejm on 25 September 2005, getting 11,282 votes in the 14 Nowy Sącz district, starting from the Civic Platform list. Reelected 2007, 2011 and 2015.

Since 2017 member of Agreement. In 2019 elected to the Sejm from the lists of Law and Justice.

See also
Members of Polish Sejm 2005-2007

References

Civic Platform politicians
1960 births
Living people
People from Zakopane
Members of the Polish Sejm 2005–2007
Members of the Polish Sejm 2007–2011
Members of the Polish Sejm 2011–2015
Members of the Polish Sejm 2019–2023
Kraków University of Economics alumni